The 1994 Girabola was the 16th season of top-tier football competition in Angola. Atlético Petróleos de Luanda were the defending champions.

The league comprised 12 teams, the bottom two of which were relegated.

Petro de Luanda were crowned champions, winning their 9th title, and second in a row, while Inter da Huíla and Sagrada Esperança were relegated.

Kabongo of Sonangol do Namibe finished as the top scorer with 16 goals.

Changes from the 1993 season
Relegated: Académica do Lobito, Desportivo da Nocal, FC de Cabinda
Promoted: Independente do Tômbwa, Sonangol do Namibe, Sporting de Luanda

League table

Results

Season statistics

Top scorer
 Kabongo

Champions

External links
Federação Angolana de Futebol

Girabola seasons
Angola
Angola